The Friedrich Loeffler Institute (FLI), is the Federal Institute for Animal Health of Germany, that country's leading animal disease center. The institute was founded in 1910 and named for its founder Friedrich Loeffler in 1952. The FLI is situated on the Isle of Riems, which belongs to the City of Greifswald. Riems is a very small island that can be reached via a dam, which can be closed off in case of an outbreak. Due to these circumstances, Riems posed the perfect location for one of the most modern animal health research facilities in the world.

The Friedrich Loeffler Institute is directly subordinated to the German Ministry of Food, Agriculture and Consumer Protection. Its main subject is the thorough study of livestock health and other closely related subjects including molecular biology, virus diagnostics, immunology, and epidemiology. Federal laws of Germany hold the FLI responsible for national and international animal disease control; it also poses the international reference lab for several viral diseases. The institute publishes its research, and cooperates with other national and international institutions and researchers.

Among the animal diseases under research are for instance foot and mouth disease, mad cow disease, and avian influenza.

Currently, 330 people work for the FLI, and an additional 140 will be employed upon completion of the construction work. 260 Million Euros are spent by the Federal Government to build new laboratories and barns.

As part of this extension, in 2010 the Riems Institute completed Biosafety level 4 laboratory facilities, which enable research activities on the most dangerous of viruses—one of four such facilities in Germany.

Organisation
The institution is managed by President Prof. Dr. Dr. h. c. Thomas C. Mettenleiter, who is also the Head of the Institute of molecular virology and cell biology (IMVZ) and teaches at the nearby University of Greifswald, and vice-President Prof. Dr. Franz J. Conraths, head of the Institute of Epidemiology (IfE).

The FLI consists of the following twelve institutions at seven different locations:
 Riems:
 Institute of Infectology (IMED)
 Institute of Molecular Virology and Cell Biology (IMVZ)
 Institute of Diagnostic Virology (IVD)
 Institute of Novel and Emerging Infectious Diseases (INNT)
 Institute of Immunology (IfI)
 Institute of Epidemiology (IfE)
 Institute of International Animal Health/One Health (IITG)
 Braunschweig
 Institute of Animal Nutrition (ITE)
 Celle:
 Institute of Animal Welfare and Animal Husbandry (ITT)
 Jena:
 Institute of Bacterial Infections and Zoonoses (IBIZ)
 Institute of Molecular Pathogenesis (IMP)
 Mariensee
 Institute of Farm Animal Genetics (ING)

FLI Late Scientists
 Günther M. Keil, Institute of Molecular Virology and Cell Biology (IMVZ).

Notes and references

External links 
 FLI official website (in English)

Agricultural research institutes in Germany
Animal health organizations
Biosafety level 4 laboratories
Celle
Greifswald
Organisations based in Braunschweig
Jena
Molecular biology institutes
Veterinary research institutes
1910 in science
1910 establishments in Germany
Science and technology in East Germany
Veterinary medicine in Germany